Hydra OMS is an open-source order management system and workflow suite for managing service/job orders and business processes. It is intended for use in companies and automates their complex and/or frequently changing business processes.
Hydra OMS allows companies to automate their order execution, build business process models with ISO standardized BPMN 2.0 and provide employees with a user-friendly order execution wizard. Hydra OMS can be integrated with third-party software.

Features 
Hydra OMS internally consists of:
 PostgreSQL for data keeping 
 Activiti open source BPM system
 Ruby on Rails was chosen as the wizard interface of process implementation and REST API

Hydra OMS is open-source and can be downloaded under Apache License 2.0: https://github.com/latera/homs

Applications 
Hydra OMS can be applied for managing typical tasks and providing recurring services are often complex business processes that require cooperation from several departments like that: new customer connection/provisioning, on-premises equipment installation, service and replacement, returning (for goods), claim management etc.

See also 
 Business process modeling
 Business Process Model and Notation

References 

Workflow applications
Free software programmed in Ruby